The group stage of the 1997–98 UEFA Champions League began on 17 September 1997 and ended on 10 December 1997. Eight teams qualified automatically for the group stage, while 16 more qualified via a preliminary round. The 24 teams were divided into six groups of four, and the teams in each group played against each other on a home-and-away basis, meaning that each team played a total of six group matches. For each win, teams were awarded three points, with one point awarded for each draw.

Seeding
Seeding was based on the UEFA associations 1997 ranking. Title holders and champions of nations ranked 1–5 were put in the Pot 1. Champions of nations ranked 6–7 as well as runners-up of nations ranked 1–4 formed Pot 2. The remaining qualified runners-up (from the nations 5–8) and champions of nations ranked 8–9 formed Pot 3. The remaining six national champions formed Pot 4.

Groups

Group A

Group B

Group C

Group D

Group E

Group F

Ranking of second-placed teams

References

Group Stage
1997-98